Note: This is an incomplete list that may never be able to satisfy particular standards for completeness. You can help by expanding it with reliably sourced entries.

This is a list of films produced in Bolivia from the 1920s to present.

1920s

1930s

1950s

1960s

1970s

1980s

1990s

2000s

2010s

2020s

References

Further reading 
José Sànchez-H.: The Art and Politics of Bolivian Cinema, Scarecrow Press 1999,

External links 
 Bolivian film at the Internet Movie Database

Lists of films by country of production